The Kawanishi K-11 was a 1920s Japanese single-seat carrier fighter designed and built by the  Kawanishi Aircraft Company to meet an Imperial Japanese Navy requirement. The type did not enter service and only two prototypes were built.

Development and design
The K-11 was a private venture programme designed to meet a 1926 Imperial Japanese Navy requirement for a single-seat carrier fighter to replace the Mitsubishi 1MF, competing against officially sponsored designs from Aichi (the Aichi Type H), Mitsubishi (the 1MF9) and Nakajima. The K-11 Experimental Carrier Fighter was an equal-span biplane with a conventional landing gear and powered by  BMW inline engine. It had a metal fuselage with fabric covering and wooden wings.

The first prototype made its maiden flight in July 1927, with a second prototype, with a modified fuselage and tail, being built in 1928. The type was not accepted by the Navy, however, with the Nakajima design being selected, entering production as the A1N. The two K-11s were used by Kawanishi as communications and liaison aircraft.

Specifications

See also

References
Notes

Bibliography

1920s Japanese fighter aircraft
K-11
Biplanes
Single-engined tractor aircraft
Aircraft first flown in 1927